Daniel "Dani" Pedro Calvo San Román (born 1 April 1994) is a Spanish professional footballer who plays as a centre-back for Real Oviedo.

Club career

Numancia
Born in Huesca, Aragon, Calvo began his career with CD Peñas Oscenses. He signed with CD Numancia in 2012, being initially assigned to the youth setup and being promoted to the B team in 2013.

On 8 June 2014, Calvo played his first match as a professional, starting in a 1–1 home draw against SD Eibar in the Segunda División. On 31 August of the following year he joined another reserve team, Atlético Levante UD on loan for one year.

Calvo featured regularly after his return, scoring his first professional goal on 4 February 2017 by netting his side's first in the 3–2 away win over AD Alcorcón. Late in that month, he extended his contract until 2020.

Elche
On 24 December 2018, relegated to the bench after the arrival of Derik Osede, Calvo was loaned to fellow second division club Elche CF until June. The following May, after avoiding relegation, he agreed to a permanent deal.

Calvo contributed 41 appearances in the 2019–20 season, as his team achieved promotion in the play-offs. He made his La Liga debut on 26 September 2020, starting in a 0–3 home loss against Real Sociedad. He scored his first goal in the league the following 20 February, the only in a victory over SD Eibar also at the Estadio Manuel Martínez Valero.

Oviedo
On 27 July 2021, free agent Calvo signed a two-year contract with Real Oviedo in the second division.

Personal life
Calvo's father, Ramón, was also a footballer and a defender. He notably represented Deportivo de La Coruña and Real Valladolid.

Career statistics

References

External links

1994 births
Living people
People from Huesca
Sportspeople from the Province of Huesca
Spanish footballers
Footballers from Aragon
Association football defenders
La Liga players
Segunda División players
Segunda División B players
Tercera División players
CD Numancia B players
CD Numancia players
Atlético Levante UD players
Elche CF players
Real Oviedo players